Uzemain is a commune in the Vosges department in Grand Est in northeastern France.

Geography
The Côney forms part of the commune's eastern border, flows westward through the southern part of the commune, crosses the village, and forms part of the commune's southwestern border.

See also
Communes of the Vosges department

References

External links

Official site

Communes of Vosges (department)
Vosges communes articles needing translation from French Wikipedia